Rex D. M. Hazlewood (born 22 August 1903) was a long-serving official of The Boy Scouts Association of the United Kingdom and was its editor of The Scout and The Scouter magazines and author of articles, pamphlets and books on Scouting.

Background
Hazlewood was appointed editor of The Scouter magazine in 1944, a position he would hold until his retirement in 1968.

From June 1954 through September 1966, Hazlewood was the editor of The Scout magazine.

Hazlewood wrote a number of instructional Scouting books, primarily on the subject of Scoutcraft. Many of his books were co-authored with his friend John Thurman. In 1961, he co-wrote, B-P's Scouts: an official history of The Boy Scouts Association.

Works
 1948 
 1949: 
 1952: 
 1957: 
 1958: 
 1959: 
 1960: 
 1961: 
 1961: 
 1961: 
 1962: 
 1964: 
 1969:

References

External links

Scouting website

The Scout Association
1903 births
Year of death missing